Microdaccus is a genus of beetles in the family Carabidae, containing the following species:

 Microdaccus escalerai Morvan, 1977
 Microdaccus glasunovi Emetz, 1979
 Microdaccus opacicolor (Reitter, 1897)
 Microdaccus opacus (Schaum, 1857)
 Microdaccus pulchellus Schaum, 1864
 Microdaccus teodoroi Gridelli, 1930

References

Lebiinae